The Bangladesh Scouts is the national Scouting organization of Bangladesh. Scouting was founded in 1914 in East Bengal, now Bangladesh, as part of the British Indian branch of The Scout Association, and continued as part of the Pakistan Boy Scouts Association until the country's divided sections split in 1971 during the Bangladesh Liberation War. Following its independence, in 1972, the Bangladesh Boy Scout Association was officially formed as successor of the Pakistan Boy Scouts Association. Bangladesh became an independent member of the World Organization of the Scout Movement in 1974. The organization changed its name to "Bangladesh Scouts" in 1978. The organization has 1,474,460 members as of 2015.

History 
Scouting in modern Bangladesh started as part of the British Indian branch of The Scout Association. After the partition of India, the "East Pakistan Boy Scout Association" was formed as a regional association within the Pakistan Boy Scouts Association.

Scouting was officially founded in British India in 1909, first starting at the Bishop Cotton Boys' School in Bangalore. Scouting for native Indians was started by Justice Vivian Bose, Pandit Madan Mohan Malaviya, Pandit Hridayanath Kunzru, Girija Shankar Bajpai, Annie Besant and George Arundale, in 1913. Prior to this date, Scouting was open only for British and foreign Scouts. On 4 February 1914, Sir Robert Scallon, British Commander of the Concentration at Dhaka, visited St. Gregory's School in Dhaka – at that time purely European and Eurasian (Anglo) School. As the Boy Scouts were unknown in Dhaka, with only four Troops existing down in Calcutta, Sir Robert invited the boys to try and establish a troop.

Mr. Francis, Organiser of the Boy Scouts, came with Captain Pakenham Walsh and his lantern photos on the work of the Boy Scouts. That was on 2 March 1914, Mr. Francis, as Scoutmaster of the area, enrolled six of the school's boys who had passed the Tenderfoot Test. The final approval by the Bengal Provincial Commissioner was signed by Mr. H Beuran. It lists Serjt. R Narnett, Inspector of Police as pro-tem Scoutmaster, Brother Bertin, then the Headmaster of the School gave all encouragement, Bro. Vital was named as Assistant Scoutmaster on probation.

The Troop was officially named: The FIRST DHAKA, St. Gregory's Troop..NUMBER ONE. The date on the Approval was 7 May 1914. The Scoutmaster was Mr. Harnett. The total strength of the Troop was forty boys, as of 27 April 1914.

The Britist Official Approval, Dalil lists St. Gregory's as the First Troop in the Dhaka or East Bengal area. Later on, separate groups in Calcutta were entitled One to Four, and St. Gregory's became Fifth Troop of the Bengal Presidency. The first scouts were David Pogose, Peter Gomes, Alfred Ferguson, Harold Armstead, Cyril Lucas and Osmund D'Silva. The school had Five Patrols and Mr. Francis listed the total number of Scouts as 40,to be going on their first camp in January 1915.

In 1916, a Cub section was started, followed by the Rover section in 1918.

In 1916, Calcutta's Senior Deputy Commissioner of Police J. S. Wilson introduced Scouting for Boys as a textbook in the Calcutta Police Training School. Colonel Wilson volunteered his services to the District Scout Commissioner, Alfred Pickford, and in 1917 became Assistant Scoutmaster of the Old Mission Church Troop. Together the two struggled for the admission of Indian boys into The Scout Association, which had not been admitted due to a Government of India order against it because "Scouting might train them to become revolutionaries". Shortly Wilson was acting as Cubmaster and Scoutmaster, and succeeded Pickford as District Commissioner in May 1919 when Pickford was promoted to Chief Scout Commissioner for India.

As a way of getting around the Government Order, the Boy Scouts of Bengal was founded, with identical aims and methods. Many separate Scout organizations began to spring up, the Indian Boy Scouts Association, founded in 1916, based in Madras and headed by Annie Besant and George Arundale; Boy Scouts of Mysore; Boy Scouts of Baroda; Nizam's Scouts in Hyderabad; Seva Samiti Scout Association (Humanity Uplift Service Society), founded in 1917 by Madan Mohan Malaviya and Hridayanath Kunzru and based in Allahabad; the aforementioned Boy Scouts of Bengal and likely others. A conference was held in Calcutta in August 1920 in which Wilson staged a Scout Rally, and as a result the Viceroy of India sent an invitation to Lord Baden-Powell, by then Chief Scout of the World, to visit India. Lord and Lady Baden-Powell arrived in Bombay in late January 1921 for a short tour of the subcontinent before leaving Calcutta for Rangoon. Alfred Pickford accompanied them and became one of their closest friends.

The result of this visit was a union of all of the Scout organizations except the Seva Samiti Scout Association into The Boy Scouts Association in India. In 1922 Pickford returned to England and was appointed Overseas Commissioner of The Boy Scouts Association at their headquarters in London, but his dream of allowing local boys into the program had been fulfilled.

In 1938, a number of members left the Boy Scouts Association in India after a wave of nationalism. They formed – together with the Seva Samiti Scout Association and the newly founded India National Scout Association – the Hindustan Scout Association, the first coeducational Scouting and Guiding organisation in India. In the same year, the Boy Scouts Association in India became a member of the World Organization of the Scout Movement.

J. S. Wilson, Director of the Boy Scouts International Bureau, visited Karachi in 1952 as guest of J.D. Shuja, the General Secretary of the Pakistan Boy Scouts Association. During his visit, he saw Bhit Island, off Karachi, a fishing community primarily of refugees, who had been adopted by a Karachi Scout group, the Rovers and older Scouts of which were staffing a school until a regular teacher could be appointed. In Bahawalpur, Wilson was welcomed by Brigadier M.A. Abbasi, Deputy Chief Scout Commissioner who had been at the 1951 World Jamboree in Austria and would later lead the Pakistani contingent at the 1957 Jubilee Jamboree. At Lahore, Wilson met the Scouts and Bluebirds (Brownies) of the Deaf and Dumb Institute, and visited A.R. Sardar Hussain, Scout Camp Chief for Pakistan, Squadron Leader H.V. Bhatty, Scout Provincial Secretary, Nicholas Rozario, Deputy Camp Chief (East Pakistan), and Mir M. Mohsin, Deputy Camp Chief (West Pakistan), who later succeeded Shuja as General Secretary.

In 1958, the second National Jamboree of the Pakistan Boy Scouts Association was held at Chittagong with 4,000 participants. The fifth National Jamboree of the Pakistan Boy Scouts Association in 1969 used the grounds of the new training center of the East Pakistan Boy Scouts Association at Mouchak.

Scouting continued in East and West Pakistan as part of the Pakistan Boy Scouts Association until the country was split in the 1970s.

During the Bangladesh Liberation War, in April 1971, members of the renamed "Bangladesh Boy Scout Association" volunteered to carry the mail from the Bangladesh Army field post offices to the nearest Post Office in India. In 1972, the First National Council of Scouting in Bangladesh was held in 8 and 9 April, and during the council on 9 April 1972 the "Bangladesh Boy Scout Association" was officially formed as successor of the East Pakistan Boy Scout Association. Peare Ali Nazir was elected as first National commissioner. On 11 September 1972 The Government of The People's Republic of Bangladesh approved the Scout Association by the Ordinance No. 111/1972.

On 1 June 1974 "Bangladesh Boy Scout Association" became the 105th independent member of the World Organization of the Scout Movement. Both predecessors, the British Indian branch of The Scout Association as well as the Pakistan Boy Scouts Association were also members of the World Organization of the Scout Movement during their activity in modern Bangladesh.

Later on 30 December 1978 the organization changed its name to "Bangladesh Scouts". Since 1994, girls are accepted as members.

Outreach 

Scouting has grown over the years in the face of considerable difficulties. Scouts are involved in community service, major areas being agriculture, health and sanitation, child welfare, community development, construction and repair of low cost housing and sports.

During national disasters, such as the many floods that strike Bangladesh, Scouts are called to help with flood control, relocation of citizens and organizing shelters.

Membership is open to youth between 6 and 25 years of age, regardless of caste, creed or color. Bangladesh Scouts receive strong support from the government, which recognized Scouting's value in citizenship training.

By 2013, Bangladesh Scouts envisions to grow membership by 1.5 million by offering challenging youth programme through a value based educational system, in partnership with government, agencies and community towards building a better world.

Program and ideals 

 Cub Scouts – ages 6 to 10+
 Scouts – ages 11 to 16+
 Rover Scouts – ages 17 to 25

The monogram of the Bangladesh Scouts incorporates elements of the flag of Bangladesh as well as the crescent moon as a symbol of service and the white background is the symbol of peace.

Purpose of the Scout Movement

The purpose of the Scout movement is "To contribute to the development of young people in achieving their full physical, intellectual, social and spiritual potentials as individuals, as responsible citizens and members of their local, national and international community’s" .

Principles of the Scout Movement

The Scout movement is based on three broad principles: "Duty to God ","Duty to others" and "Duty to self".

Scout Method

The Scout method is defined as a system of progressive self-education through:
1. Promise and law.
2. Learning by doing.
3. Membership of small groups.
4. Progressive and stimulating programs.

Fundamentals of Scouting

Scouting is "a voluntary non political educational movement for the young people, open to all without distinction of origin, race or creed in accordance with the purpose, principles and method conceived by the founder Lord Baden Powell ".

Mission Statement

The Mission of world Scouting is "to Contribute to the education of young people, through a value system based on the scout promise and law, to help build a better world where people are self fulfilled as individuals and play a constructive role in society ".

Scout Promise (প্রতিজ্ঞা) 
On my honour I promise that I will do my best
-to do my duty to God and my country
-to help other people at all times
-to obey the Scout law.

আমি আমার আত্মমর্যাদার উপর নির্ভর করে প্রতিজ্ঞা
-স্রষ্টা ও আমার দেশের প্রতি কর্তব্য পালন করতে
-সর্বদা অপরকে সাহায্য করতে
-স্কাউট আইন মেনে চলতে
আমি আমার যথাসাধ্য চেষ্টা করব।

Scout Law (স্কাউট আইন)

Motto 
Cub Scout Motto: Do your best''  ("যথাসাধ্য চেষ্টা করা")

Scout Motto: Be prepared ("সদা প্রস্তুত")

Rover Scout Motto: Service ("সেবা")

Combining all three we can say: Do your best to be prepared for service. ("সেবার জন্য সদা প্রস্তুত থাকতে যথাসাধ্য চেষ্টা করা"''')

Uniform 

Cub Scouts, Scouts, Rover Scouts and adult leaders have to wear specific uniform after taking oath as a member of the Scout Movement. Uniform differs from institution to institution and each scout region has its own regional patch, worn on the sleeve. The most common type is deep blue trousers along with light blue shirt, navy-blue cap with Scout region insignia emblazoned on it and scout group specific scarf for boys, with salwar-kameez(navy-blue salwar and light-blue kameez)for girls along with navy-blue cross-belt. Female adult leaders wear light blue saree with deep-blue blouse which has the region patch and Bangladesh sleeve patch emblazoned. Male adult leaders and Rover Scouts wear shirts with full sleeves in contrast to short-sleeved shirt for Cub Scouts and Scouts. Naval scouts have white uniforms. Everybody has to wear black shoes, navy blue caps, and specific scarves with the uniform. Scout nametags have the scouter's name written first in Bengali and then in English, inspired from the BNCC nametag design.

Woggle design varies from school to school, with most school scout units going for a ring-type scarf woggle rather than slide-type designs in other nations. The Air region has its own custom waist belt, which is basically the same belt design used by the Bangladesh Air Force

Training Center 
The National Scout Training Center (NSTC) is at Mouchak, Gazipur. It includes a Scout Museum inaugurated in November 2007 on the occasion of one hundredth anniversary of scouting. There are also 10 Regional Scout Training Centers (RSTC) at:
 Bahadurpur (Rover Scout Training Centre), Gazipur
 Muktagacha, Mymensingh
 Kaptai, Rangamati
 Dosmail, Dinajpur
 Lokkhonabond, Sylhet
 Rupatoly, Barisal
 Lalmai, Comilla
 Pulerhat, Khulna
 Nawdapara, Rajshahi
 Nawdapara, Bogra

National Scout Jamboree

National Rover Moot and Community Development Camp (COMDECA)

See also 
 Bangladesh Girl Guides Association

References

External links 
 

World Organization of the Scout Movement member organizations
Scouting and Guiding in Bangladesh
Youth organizations established in 1972
1972 establishments in Bangladesh